Dueños del paraíso (English: Owners of Paradise), is a 2015 Spanish-language telenovela produced by United States-based television network Telemundo Studios, Miami in co-production by Chile-based television network TVN. The telenovela is inspired by the drug trade of Miami in the 1970s.

It starred Kate del Castillo as "Anastasia Cardona", and Jorge Zabaleta and José María Torre as the main protagonists.

Plot 
Traumatized by the events of a difficult life and driven to avenge the betrayal of a husband, Anastasia Cardona (Kate del Castillo) will find, in the illicit business of her husband, the wealth which she has always desired. Her thirst for power overrides any limits when choosing her victims. Willing to do anything it takes to defeat her enemies, Anastasia will endure trials of betrayal and the impossibility of living a life with true love.

Cast

Main 
 Kate del Castillo as Anastasia Cardona
 Adriana Barraza as Irene Medrano
 Jorge Zabaleta as Conrado San Miguel
 José María Torre as Adán Romero
 Miguel Varoni as Leandro Quezada
 Guillermo Quintanilla as Nataniel Cardona
 Alberto Jiménez as Salvador Ferrara
 Ximena Duque as Erika San Miguel
 Tony Dalton as Renato Maldonado
 Sofía Lama as Silvana Cardona
 Tiago Correa as Mario Alejandro Esparza
 Juan Pablo Llano as Ignacio Elizondo
 Géraldine Bazán as Verónica Romero
 Margarita Muñoz as Gina Bianchi
 María Luisa Flores as Paola Quezada
 Pepe Gámez as Elías Cardona
 Ariel Texido as Mauricio Riquelme
 Jorge Hernández as Saúl Benavides
 Andrea López as Analía Menchaca de Esparza
 Gabriel Valenzuela as José Carlos Quezada
 Maxi Iglesias as Chad Mendoza
 Alberto Mateo as Sergio Di Franco
 Daniela Wong as Luciana Romero
 Yuly Ferreira as Daisy Muñoz
 Dayana Garroz as Rita Corona
 Ana Osorio as Daytona Durán
 Beatriz Monroy as Modesta Flores
 Rachel Vallori as Vaitiare Santos
 Adrián Mas as Leobardo Gonzalvez
 María Elena Swett as Vanessa Esparza

Recurring 
 Jamie Sasson as Isabel Cordoba

Audience 
In the United States the series was released on 13 January 2015, with 3 million viewers. In Chile it scored 7.8 rating points.

Episodes

Broadcast 
The series originally aired from January 13, 2015 to April 20, 2015 in United States on Telemundo. The series aired in Chile on Televisión Nacional de Chile from January 19, 2015 until June 9, 2015. In summer of 2015 the telenovela was made available to stream in the United States on the streaming service Netflix, along with a handful of Telemundo programs.

English Subtitles on Netflix by Husna Manzar.

References

External links 

Telemundo telenovelas
Televisión Nacional de Chile telenovelas
American telenovelas
2015 telenovelas
2015 American television series debuts
2015 Chilean television series debuts
Chilean telenovelas
2015 American television series endings
2015 Chilean television series endings
Television shows set in Santiago
Television shows set in Miami
Spanish-language telenovelas
Works about Mexican drug cartels